Ganot may refer to:

Places
 Ganot, a moshav in Israel
 Ganot Hadar, a settlement in Israel

People
 Adolphe Ganot (1804-1887), a French author and publisher